Pico Mucuñuque is a mountain in the Andes of Venezuela. It has a height of 4,609 metres.

See also

 List of mountains in the Andes

References

Mountains of Venezuela
Sierra Nevada National Park (Venezuela)